Mocha Canton is a canton of Ecuador, located in the Tungurahua Province.  Its capital is the town of Mocha.  Its population at the 2001 census was 6,371.

References

Cantons of Tungurahua Province
map size"
-code x
s9()